Sir Charles Cooke (died 2 January 1721) of Hackney, Middlesex was an English merchant and politician who sat in the House of Commons from 1715 to 1721.

Cooke was the eldest son of Thomas Cooke of Hackney and the brother of James Cooke, MP for Tregony.

Cooke was returned as Member of Parliament for Grampound at the 1715 general election. He was Master of the Worshipful Company of Mercers in 1716. He was knighted in January 1717 and appointed Sheriff of London the same year. Following his death he left a bequest to Morden College.

Cooke died unmarried on 2 January 1721.

References

Year of birth missing
1721 deaths
English merchants
Sheriffs of the City of London
Members of the Parliament of Great Britain for constituencies in Cornwall
British MPs 1715–1722
Knights Bachelor